Mohamed Aziz (born 2 December 1984) is a Moroccan former professional footballer. He retired in July 2022.

International career

International goals 
Scores and results list Morocco's goal tally first.

Honours 

RS Berkane
CAF Confederation Cup: 2020

References

External links 
 

1984 births
Living people
Moroccan footballers
Morocco international footballers
RS Berkane players
Botola players
Association football defenders